RuneQuest Companion is a tabletop role-playing game supplement for RuneQuest. Originally published by Chaosium in 1983, it consisted of reprints of Wyrm's Footnotes magazine articles as well as new material to expand the game rules and setting.  It received positive reviews in game periodicals including Dragon, White Dwarf, Fantasy Gamer, and Different Worlds. It was republished in 2019 in PDF format as part of Chaosium's RuneQuest: Classic Edition Kickstarter.

Contents
RuneQuest Companion is a supplement consisting of 
 reprints of magazine articles
 an errata sheet with corrections and additions to the second edition of RuneQuest
 new material left out of Trollpak
 a new history and geography of the Holy Country by Greg Stafford
 a solo adventure scenario by Alan LaVergne 
 a short story, "The Smell of a Rat", also by Lavergne
 details of illusion Rune magic by Stafford
 details of unicorns and trolls by Sandy Petersen
 fragments of fictional correspondence
 excerpts from chronicles of notable and historical figures of Glorantha
 and more.

Publication history
In 1976, the year after Chaosium released their first product, the fantasy board game  White Bear and Red Moon, the company published Wyrm's Footnotes, a magazine dedicated to providing supplemental material about the game. When Chaosium released its fantasy role-playing game Runequest in 1978, set in Glorantha, articles about the fictional world began to appear in Wyrm's Footnotes. By 1981, Wyrm's Footnotes was solely dedicated to articles about Glorantha. However, the magazine was discontinued in 1982, and as Ken Rolston noted, "When publication of Wyrm's Footnotes ended, a most important source of detail, both epic and trivial, about Glorantha disappeared." 

In 1983, RuneQuest Companion was released as a 72-page book edited by Charlie Krank that contained a collection of previously published Wyrm's Footnotes articles as well as new material. 

As several contemporary reviewers noted, RuneQuest Companion was initially publicized as the first in a projected series of Companion books. However, no other volumes were ever published.

Reception
In the July 1983 edition of Dragon (Issue #75), Ken Rolston noted the need for supplementary information about Glorantha, given the demise of Wyrm's Footnotes. Rolston liked the production values of the Companion, pointing out it was "edited and maintained according to Chaosium's usual high standards." Rolston concluded with a strong recommendation for RuneQuest players. 

In the October 1983 edition of White Dwarf (Issue #46), Oliver Dickinson thought that the material included was "entertaining stuff, but not as interesting or useful to newer players as reprints of the [Wyrm's Footnotes] articles on the elemental pantheons would have been, for instance, or the thought-provoking articles on aspects of the rules by various authors in the last four issues." Dickinson concluded by giving this supplement an above average rating of 8 out of 10, saying it contained "a high proportion of useful or entertaining material and little that is totally peripheral. Production quality is good overall, with a few errors or misprints."

References

External links
 

Role-playing game supplements introduced in 1983
RuneQuest 2nd edition supplements